Bill Keane (18 May 1900 – 21 March 1978) was an  Australian rules footballer who played with Geelong in the Victorian Football League (VFL).

Keane was appointed as playing coach of the Beechworth Football Club in the Ovens and Murray Football League in 1925.

Notes

External links 

1900 births
1978 deaths
Australian rules footballers from Victoria (Australia)
Geelong Football Club players